Virginie Moinard (born 7 August 1981 in Thiais, France) is a French road and track racing cyclist.

Moinard won the under-23 individual time trial at the 2003 European Road Championships, and finished third in the under-23 road race in 2002. At the track she won a bronze medal in the scratch at the 2004–05 UCI Track Cycling World Cup Classics in Manchester.

References

External links
 

1981 births
Living people
French female cyclists
French track cyclists
People from L'Haÿ-les-Roses
Sportspeople from Val-de-Marne
Cyclists from Île-de-France
20th-century French women
21st-century French women